Persatuan Sepakbola Kuta Binjei Sekitar (simply known as PSKBS) is an Indonesian football club based in East Aceh Regency, Aceh. They currently compete in the Liga 3.

References

External links

Football clubs in Indonesia
 Football clubs in Aceh